Hungary competed at the 2010 Summer Youth Olympics, the inaugural Youth Olympic Games, held in Singapore from 14 August to 26 August 2010.

Medalists

Archery

Boys

Mixed Team

Athletics

Boys
Field Events

Girls
Track and Road Events

Field Events

Boxing

Boys

Canoeing

Boys

Girls

Cycling

Cross Country

Time Trial

BMX

Road Race

Overall

Fencing

Group Stage

Knock-Out Stage

Gymnastics

Artistic Gymnastics

Boys

Girls

Judo

Individual

Team

Modern pentathlon

Rowing

Sailing

One Person Dinghy

Windsurfing

Shooting

Pistol

Rifle

Swimming

Boys

Girls

Table tennis

Individual

Team

Tennis

Singles

Doubles

Triathlon

Girls

Men's

Mixed

Weightlifting

Wrestling

Freestyle

Greco-Roman

References
Hungarian Delegation on the website of the Hungarian Olympic Committee

External links
Competitors List: Hungary – Singapore 2010 official site
 Schedule/Results – Singapore 2010 official site

Summer Youth Olympics
Nations at the 2010 Summer Youth Olympics
Hungary at the Youth Olympics